Émilie Caen is a French actress. She is known for playing the role of Ségolène in Serial (Bad) Weddings.

Filmography

References

External links
 

Living people
21st-century French actresses
French film actresses
French television actresses
Year of birth missing (living people)